Avondale is a census-designated place (CDP) in Jefferson Parish, Louisiana, United States, on the west bank of the Mississippi River. The population was 4,582 in 2020. It is part of the New Orleans–Metairie–Kenner metropolitan statistical area.

Geography
It is bordered to the west by Waggaman and to the east by Bridge City, while to the north, across the Mississippi, it is bordered by the city of Harahan.

Demographics

According to the 2020 United States census, there were 4,582 people, 1,729 households, and 1,239 families residing in the CDP. The 2019 American Community Survey reported there were 5,321 people and 1,729 households residing in the census-designated place. Of the population in 2019, there were 1,729 households spread among 1,838 housing units. The average family size was 3.72.

In 2019, the racial and ethnic makeup of the CDP was 40.3% non-Hispanic white, 35.4% Black or African American, 15.9% Asian, 1.2% some other race, 0.2% two or more races, and 9.0% Hispanic and Latino American of any race. An estimated 14.0% of its population was foreign-born, and the median age was 36.7. Other than English, 8.3% of the population spoke Spanish, 16.4% Asian and Pacific Islander languages, and 1.8% other Indo-European languages. In 2020, the U.S. Census Bureau tabulated a total racial and ethnic composition of 41.34% non-Hispanic whites, 31.51% Black or African Americans, 0.41% Native Americans, 10.78% Asians, 3.84% other races and ethnicities, and 12.11% Hispanic and Latino American of any race; the census estimates and tabulation have represented the diversification of the U.S. nationwide and its non-Hispanic white demographic decline.

The median income for a household in the CDP was $40,503, up from $35,917 at the 2000 U.S. census; approximately 14.8% of the population lived at or below the poverty line, up from 17.3% in 2000.

Education
Jefferson Parish Public Schools operates public schools.

Most residents are zoned to Catherine Strehle Elementary School in Avondale and some are zoned to Lucille Cherbonnier/Norbert Rillieux Elementary School in Waggaman. All residents are zoned to Henry Ford Middle School in Avondale and L.W. Higgins High School in Marrero. In regards to advanced studies academies, residents are zoned to the Marrero Academy and Patrick F. Taylor Science and Technology Academy.

Previously a portion of the community was zoned to Norbert Rillieux Elementary in Waggaman. In 2012 the school board announced Rillieux was being considered for consolidation into Lucille Cherbonnier Elementary.

References

External links

Avondale Louisiana Resource Guide
Henry Ford Middle School
Catherine Strehle Elementary School

Census-designated places in Louisiana
Census-designated places in Jefferson Parish, Louisiana
Census-designated places in New Orleans metropolitan area
Louisiana populated places on the Mississippi River